The Voice of Conscience (German: Die Stimme des Gewissens) is a 1920 Austrian silent film directed by Jacob Fleck and Luise Fleck and starring Liane Haid, Max Neufeld and Wilhelm Klitsch.

Cast
 Liane Haid
 Max Neufeld
 Wilhelm Klitsch
 Karl Ehmann
 Josefine Josephi

References

Bibliography
 Parish, Robert. Film Actors Guide. Scarecrow Press, 1977.

External links

1920 films
Austrian silent feature films
Films directed by Jacob Fleck
Films directed by Luise Fleck
Austrian black-and-white films